Katie Rich is an American comedian, writer, producer and actress best known for her work on Saturday Night Live.

Early life
Rich was raised on the south side of Chicago, where she attended the grammar school St. Bede's, until her family moved to the suburb of Orland Park, Illinois. She graduated from Carl Sandburg High School and Northwestern University.

Career

Early work
Rich began her career at Chicago's iO Theater, where she was part of a group called “Carl and the Passions.” During her time at iO, Rich also performed in a sketch show that she created with fellow comedian Kate Duffy called The Mary Kay Letourneau Players Present. She left iO to join The Second City, a comedy troupe with which she toured for three and a half years before moving to its mainstage cast. While in the mainstage cast, Rich performed in the show South Side of Heaven, among others.

Saturday Night Live
In December 2013, after auditioning for Lorne Michaels twice, Rich was hired to write for Saturday Night Live. She was also recommended  for the job by SNL cast member Cecily Strong, a friend of Rich's who was her understudy during her time at The Second City. Rich is one of four writers who work exclusively on SNLs Weekend Update segment.

On January 20, 2017, following Donald Trump's presidential inauguration, Rich tweeted about Trump's youngest son, 10-year-old Barron, saying he "will be this country's first homeschool shooter." NBC rapidly suspended Rich and had her name deleted from the Saturday Night Live closing credits. After widespread criticism, Rich deleted the tweet and deactivated her account, reactivating it on January 23 with an apology for what she called her "insensitive" and "inexcusable" comments. On January 26, 2017, Trump responded to Rich's tweet by calling Rich "terrible" and saying, "For them to attack, for NBC to attack my 10-year-old son ... It’s a disgrace."

As of August 10, 2017, Rich has returned to SNL, credited as one of the writers on the SNL spinoff Weekend Update: Summer Edition.

She left the show in 2019, after six years.

Films and Television 
Rich has appeared in the films The Ice Harvest (2005), Janie Jones (2010), and Bad Johnson (2014). She has also appeared in the Netflix show It’s Bruno and as various voices on Showtime’s Our Cartoon President. Rich has also written for many awards shows such as The ESPYS, NFL Honors, The Golden Globes, and The Emmys. She is also the co-creator and executive producer of the Netflix animated show Chicago Party Aunt.

Commercials
Rich has appeared in commercials for Discover Card and Walmart.

Awards 
In 2015, she and her fellow Saturday Night Live writers were nominated for a Writers Guild of America Award for Comedy/Variety - Sketch Series.

Personal life 
In July 2015, Rich married Devlin Murdock, who worked at the Museum of Science and Industry and later as a programs director for Recovery on Water, a rowing club for breast cancer survivors. As of at least September 2015, she divides her time between New York City and Chicago.

Rich has revealed that she suffers from anxiety and panic disorder.

Rich met Mike Gordon from Phish at a Second City show and has done various projects with Gordon and the band.

References

External links
 
 Katie Rich on Twitter

American comedy writers
Living people
1981 births
People from Orland Park, Illinois
Writers from Chicago
21st-century American women writers
Northwestern University alumni
21st-century American actresses
Actresses from Chicago
American television writers
American women television writers
Screenwriters from Illinois
21st-century American screenwriters